Sin After Sin is the third studio album by English heavy metal band Judas Priest, released on 8 April 1977 by Columbia Records. Produced by Deep Purple bassist Roger Glover, it was the band's major label debut, their first album for the label, and their only album to feature drummer Simon Phillips, a studio musician who replaced original drummer Alan Moore for the recording sessions.

Background
After releasing their first two albums on the small Gull label, Judas Priest grew dissatisfied with what they saw as a lack of financial support from their record company. The move to CBS required breaking their contract with Gull, and once the legal dust had settled the band had forfeited the rights to those first two albums and all related recordings to Gull.

Production

Rehearsals for the Sin After Sin sessions took place at Pinewood Studios in London, with recording commencing in January 1977 at the Who's Ramport Studios in the Battersea district of London. Deep Purple bassist Roger Glover was hired to produce the album with Mark Dodson serving as engineer. The band's studio experiences while with Gull were less than satisfying, particularly during the mixing of Rocka Rolla, and they were initially quite keen to produce Sin After Sin themselves. CBS, however, insisted on an experienced producer. Deep Purple bassist Roger Glover was suggested and the band agreed, but after one session the band fired Glover, informing him that they would continue on their own. After a few weeks of struggling with unsatisfactory recordings, the band recalled Glover and the sessions began anew, with only six allotted days remaining. It was also during this period that the band parted ways with drummer Alan Moore, feeling that his technique was too limited for their evolving sound. Session drummer Simon Phillips was brought in to finish the sessions.

The album includes a cover of the Joan Baez song "Diamonds & Rust", a decision which was encouraged by producer Roger Glover in the interest of adding a track with commercial potential. Indeed, "Diamonds & Rust" was the first song by Judas Priest to receive radio play, and Baez herself reportedly enjoyed the cover. This was the band's second attempt to cover the track, and the earlier version from the Gull Records era was only released in 1978 on the compilation album The Best of Judas Priest and as a bonus track on the 1987 reissue of Rocka Rolla.

The "brazenly homoerotic" song "Raw Deal" has been described as vocalist Rob Halford's coming-out song, and a "heavy metal gay rights song". Halford came out as a gay man in 1998.

Touring
As session drummer Simon Phillips had commitments to another band, he declined to join Judas Priest as a permanent member. As a result, former Fancy drummer Les Binks was hired for the subsequent tour. An acquaintance of producer Glover, Binks was able to play double bass, and was one of the few drummers who could replicate Phillips' drum parts live.

A live tape from their headlining show in Croydon on 1 May 1977 shows that all the album's songs except one, "Last Rose of Summer", were played on the 1977 tour. "Raw Deal" and "Here Come the Tears" were only played at headlining shows and permanently retired after this tour, "Let Us Prey/Call for the Priest" was also played a few times in 1978, "Sinner" and "Diamonds and Rust" became regulars on future setlists while "Starbreaker" and "Dissident Aggressor" returned to the band's setlists after a lengthy absence, in 2011 and 2008 respectively.

With major label support, Sin After Sin marked Judas Priest's first-ever opportunity to tour the United States, where they served as the opening act for REO Speedwagon and Foreigner.

Reception
Sin After Sin was Judas Priest's most commercially successful release to date, reaching number 23 in the UK Albums Chart. That success was difficult to duplicate in the US where Sin After Sin failed to chart. At home, they also faced a somewhat hostile reception or were outright ignored by a music press which was at that time heavily focused on the new genre of punk rock which swept Britain in the late 1970s. Though it would take several years, Sin After Sin is the first of eleven consecutive Judas Priest albums to be certified gold or higher by the RIAA.

Sin After Sin introduced the combination of the double bass drumming and rapid sixteenth-note bass rhythms combined with rapid sixteenth-note guitar rhythms that would come to define heavy metal in later years, particularly the thrash metal sub-genre which emerged in the 1980s. The track "Dissident Aggressor" was an early example of the tempo and aggression which would soon become synonymous with the New Wave of British Heavy Metal. Author Andrew L. Cope has described Sin After Sin as a key album in the development of heavy metal technique, in particular for its use of double kick drumming.

Anthrax guitarist Scott Ian has been quoted as saying that Mark Dodson's engineering work on this album (and later on 1984's Defenders of the Faith) inspired the band to hire him to produce their 1988 album State of Euphoria.

Packaging and artwork

Sin After Sin was the final Judas Priest album to feature their original "gothic cursive font" logo, though it would be used on later Gull Records reissues of their pre–Sin After Sin material.

The mausoleum depicted on the Sin After Sin album cover is based on a photograph of the Egyptianate mausoleum built in 1910 for Colonel Alexander Gordon, located on the grounds of Putney Vale Cemetery in London.

This was the first (in order of release) of Judas Priest's main albums to be remastered in 2001, which included all of the albums between this and their 1990 Painkiller album. The remaster corrected an error in the track listing; "Call for the Priest", which forms one track with "Let Us Prey", had erroneously been listed as forming one track with "Raw Deal" until then.

Inspired band names

The band Starbreaker, formed in 2005 and led by TNT vocalist Tony Harnell, whose singing style was heavily influenced by Rob Halford in his formative years, named themselves after the song "Starbreaker". Germany's Sinner and its vocalist/bassist Mat Sinner, born Matthias Lasch, both derive their names from the song "Sinner". In 1997, Mat Sinner formed Judas Priest soundalikes Primal Fear whose lead vocalist Ralf Scheepers had been on a list of singers under consideration as the replacement for Rob Halford.

Track listing

Personnel

Judas Priest

Rob Halford – vocals
K. K. Downing – guitars
Glenn Tipton – guitars, piano on "Here Come the Tears", arrangements on "Diamonds and Rust", organ on "Let Us Pray"
Ian Hill – bass
Simon Phillips – drums and percussion

Additional Musicians
Les Binks – drums (Track 9)
Dave Holland – drums (Track 10)

Production
Wessex Sound Studios – mixing location
Produced by Roger Glover and Judas Priest
Engineered by Mark Dodson
Art direction by Rosław Szaybo
Design and photography by Bob Carlos Clarke
David Hemmings, Arnakata Artistes Ltd. – management

Charts

Certifications

|-

References

Works cited

 
 

1977 albums
Albums produced by Roger Glover
Columbia Records albums
Judas Priest albums